Landing Zone Uplift (also known as LZ Uplift or Deo Nhong Pass) is a former U.S. Army base north of Phù Mỹ in Vietnam.

History
The base was established in 1966 by the 1st Cavalry Division on Highway 1, approximately 8 km north of Phu My in Bình Định Province to support Operation Thayer. The base served as the base camp of the 2nd Brigade, 1st Cavalry Division.

Other units stationed at Uplift included:
1st Battalion, 50th Infantry
1st Battalion, 503rd Infantry
1st Battalion, 69th Armor
7th Battalion, 13th Artillery
7th Battalion, 15th Artillery
4th Battalion, 60th Artillery

On 11 June 1967, a UH-1D helicopter (tail number 63-12958, call sign "Bamboo Viper 47") carrying three crew members and two passengers departed the base for Qui Nhơn Airfield. The helicopter encountered bad weather and the pilot radioed for assistance in determining his position. A search and rescue team was dispatched to lead the helicopter to a safe airfield but could not locate it. The pilot then radioed that he was out of fuel and was going to make a water landing, but the helicopter was not heard from again.

On 7 September 1970, following a mortar attack on the base, a patrol was sent out from the base to attack the mortar position and was ambushed with mines destroying several armored vehicles. Staff sergeant Glenn H. English Jr. was killed while trying to rescue another soldier from a burning vehicle when it exploded and was posthumously awarded the Congressional Medal of Honor for his actions.

Current use
The base is abandoned and largely turned over to farmland. A large PAVN victory monument is located on part of the former base.

References

Installations of the United States Army in South Vietnam
Buildings and structures in Bình Định province